Md. Abdul Hai is a politician from Munshiganj District of Bangladesh. He was elected a member of parliament from Dhaka-8 and Munshiganj-4 in 1979, 1991, 1996 and 2001.

Career
Hai was elected to parliament from Dhaka-8 as a Bangladesh Nationalist Party candidate in 1979.

References

Bangladesh Nationalist Party politicians
Living people
2nd Jatiya Sangsad members
Year of birth missing (living people)
5th Jatiya Sangsad members
6th Jatiya Sangsad members
7th Jatiya Sangsad members
8th Jatiya Sangsad members